L'orso bruno is a music album by the Italian singer-songwriter Antonello Venditti, released by It in 1973. It was his first solo album, after Theorius Campus (1972) in collaboration with Francesco De Gregori. The latter co-wrote the song "L'ingresso della fabbrica".

After the album's release, Venditti declared his dissatisfaction for Vince Tempera's production; this led him to personally arrange and play all the songs in his following work, the minimalistic Le cose della vita. This included also another version of the Romanesco dialect song "E li ponti so' soli".

Track listing
"E li ponti so' soli" (3:03)
"L'uomo di pane" (5:09)
"L'ingresso della fabbrica" (4:13)
"Lontana è Milano" (4:18)
"L'orso bruno" (4:21)
"Il mare di Jan" (7:53)
"Dove" (7:04)
"Sottopassaggio" (4.22)

Orso bruno
Orso bruno